Stephen Payton (born 17 May 1977 in Uphall, Scotland) is a Paralympian athlete from Great Britain competing mainly in category T38 sprint events.

Payton has competed in four Paralympics, his first and most successful was in 1996 where he had a clean sweep of the T37 sprint events, winning gold in 100m,200m and 400m as well as winning a silver in the T34-37 4 × 100 m as part of the British team.  Four years later in Sydney he was not as successful winning bronze medals in both the T38 100m and 200m and a silver in the 400m and being part of the British team that improved to silver in the T38 relay.  By the Athens games Stephen was not part of the relay team but did still compete in the three individual sprint races but only managed a bronze in the 400m.  In the 2008 Summer Paralympics he competed in the 200m and 400m but for the first time in four games did not win a single medal. He also competed at four IPC world championships in Berlin 1994 Birmingham UK 1998 Lillie 2002 and Assen 2006 . Winning 7 gold 2 silver and 1 bronze medals. He has held the European T38 400m record since 1994 (51.37)

References

External links
 

1977 births
Living people
British male sprinters
Paralympic athletes of Great Britain
Athletes (track and field) at the 1996 Summer Paralympics
Athletes (track and field) at the 2000 Summer Paralympics
Athletes (track and field) at the 2004 Summer Paralympics
Athletes (track and field) at the 2008 Summer Paralympics
Paralympic gold medalists for Great Britain
Paralympic silver medalists for Great Britain
Paralympic bronze medalists for Great Britain
Medalists at the 1996 Summer Paralympics
Medalists at the 2000 Summer Paralympics
Medalists at the 2004 Summer Paralympics
Paralympic medalists in athletics (track and field)